Zheng Chang was a ruler of the Kingdom of Hán of the Eighteen Kingdoms during the Chu–Han Contention, an interregnum between the Qin and Han dynasties of China.

Zheng Chang was initially the magistrate of Wu County (present-day Suzhou, Jiangsu) during the Qin dynasty. He was an acquaintance of Xiang Yu, and followed the latter in rebelling against the Qin Empire around 209 BC. After the fall of the Qin Empire in 206 BC, Xiang Yu divided the former Qin territories into the Eighteen Kingdoms, and appointed Han Cheng as the King of Hán. Months later, Xiang Yu had Han Cheng killed and replaced with Zheng Chang. Later that year, Hán Xin attacked the Hán kingdom with support from Liu Bang and defeated Zheng Chang. Zheng Chang surrendered and was replaced by Hán Xin.

References
 

Chu–Han contention people
Chinese nobility